OOIOO, originally released as ∞8∞ (pronounced "eight") in Japan, is the debut album by the Japanoise band OOIOO.

Track listing

Personnel

 Yoshimi P-We - guitar, vocals, harp, casio tone, trumpet, drums, synth, Theremin, effects
 Kyoto - guitar, vocals
 Yoshiko - drums, chorus
 Maki - bass, chorus

Guests

 Julie Cafritz - Vocals (on "Speaker")
 Yamantaka Eye (aka eYe) - Electronics (on "Speaker")
 Keigo Oyamada of Cornelius - Producer

Releases information

References

1997 albums
OOIOO albums